Freedom of religion theoretically is guaranteed by article 11 of the Constitution of Turkmenistan, in practice it does not exist. This has affected the Protestant community in Turkmenistan.

List of Denominations 
 Baptist Church in Turkmenistan
 German Evangelical Lutheran Church
 Korean Methodist Church

See also 
 Religion in Turkmenistan
 Christianity in Turkmenistan
 Human rights in Turkmenistan

References 

Turkmenistan
Christianity in Turkmenistan